The Hawker 400 (also known as the Beechjet 400) is a light business jet. Initially designed and built by Mitsubishi, it has been further developed and updated by the Beech Aircraft Company, now part of Textron Aviation.

It was produced over 30 years under the names such as Mitsubishi Diamond/Diamond II, Beechjet 400/400A, and Hawker 400XP; military version T-1 Jayhawk was also produced. In total, over 900 Hawker 400s have been delivered. 

Since 2017, a factory-engineered and supported upgrade to Hawker 400XPR is provided, reducing fuel consumption by 16-20%, and improving range by as much as 33%.

Design

The Hawker 400 is a small, low-winged twin-turbofan aircraft of all metal construction, flown by a crew of two pilots and accommodating eight passengers in a pressurised cabin. Its wings use a computer-designed supercritical airfoil in order to minimise drag. Its two Pratt & Whitney Canada JT15D turbofans are mounted on the rear fuselage.

The 400 can fly  with four passengers, cruising at Mach 0.71–0.73, and most pilots are comfortable flying it over three hours, about  cruising at Mach 0.73–0.76. Typical missions are 1.5 to 2.0 hours with  block speeds.

Development

The aircraft was originally designed as the Mitsubishi MU-300 Diamond, an all-new, all-jet development to complement and slot above the Mitsubishi MU-2 and provide Mitsubishi Heavy Industries with their top-of-the-line corporate aircraft model (hence the name "Diamond"). It first flew on August 29, 1978. Mitsubishi chose to certificate the Diamond in the United States under FAA Part 25 regulations for transport aircraft, but additional requirements introduced by the FAA after the crash of an American Airlines DC-10 airliner at Chicago resulted in significant delays in the certification process, with the required changes to the aicraft adding , and the aircraft not receiving its certification until November 6, 1981. Mitsubishi went on to produce 97 MU-300s, all of which were assembled by the company's United States subsidiary.

In 1985, Mitsubishi sold the rights and a number of unfinished airframes to Beechcraft, who began manufacturing it as their own model, initially re-designated as the Beechjet 400, certificated by the Federal Aviation Administration in May 1986.
Raytheon/Beechcraft developed improvements for the 1990 400A for longer range, higher take-off weights, luxury appointments and offering an all-glass flight deck.

Beechcraft developed the T-1 Jayhawk version for the United States Air Force, used as a trainer for crew of large aircraft like tankers and strategic transports: 180 were delivered between 1992 and 1997. The Japan Air Self-Defense Force 400T trainer shares the T1-A Type certificate.

In 1993, Raytheon purchased the Hawker business jets from British Aerospace and renamed the Beechjet 400 as the Hawker 400 to include it in the line. 

In 2003, Raytheon began to produce Hawker 400XP, which included:  gross weight increase, a nine passenger seating option, thrust reversers, TCAS II, and an emergency locator beacon. 

In 2008, Hawker Beechcraft announced an improved Hawker 450XP including new, more fuel efficient Pratt & Whitney PW535Ds with 2,965 pounds of thrust each, but it was canceled in June 2009 due to poor economic conditions.
In 2009, its unit cost was $7.4 million USD.

Nextant Aerospace re-manufactured Hawker 400XP as the Nextant 400XT, replacing the JT15Ds with Williams FJ44-3APs and adding new avionics and interior. It was FAA-certified in October 2011.
Up to one-third of the 400A/400XP fleet could be retrofitted, enabling improved range, speed and fuel efficiency. It should keep their resale value to remain in economic service for another twenty to thirty years, like Falcon 20s reengined with TFE731s.

The conversion features new avionics, interior, winglets, and Williams FJ44-4A-32 engines. Hawker 400XPR was certified in 2016, and  first fully configured Hawker 400XPR was delivered in July 2017; the upgrade can be performed in 12 weeks with a choice of Rockwell Collins Pro Line 4 to 21 or Garmin G5000 avionics.

Operational history

The type is used by many corporate and private users, it is also used by air-taxi and air charter companies.

In 2014, most were U.S. registered, a majority with single aircraft operators.
Flight Options and Travel management co. were its largest operators as NetJets Europe has disposed of its fleet.
The second highest concentration was in Mexico, then Brazil, the rest were scattered throughout the world.
The USAF operated 178 T-1A Jayhawks.
Charter and fractional operators fly at least 800 to 900 hours per year while most corporate operators fly 300 to 400 hours.

Variants
 

Mitsubishi MU-300 Diamond I
Initial model, ICAO designator MU30. Two prototypes and 89 production aircraft built, 56 in active use as of 2014.

Mitsubishi MU-300-10 Diamond II
Improved version of Diamond I; 11 built, all subsequently redesignated as Beechjet 400s.

Beechcraft Model 400 Beechjet
The Diamond II built after Beechcraft bought the MU-300 production rights from Mitsubishi. 54 built in addition to the original 11 Diamond IIs. ICAO designator BE40.

Model 400A
Upgraded model, initially produced as the Beechcraft Beechjet 400A, then Raytheon Beechjet 400A, then Raytheon Hawker 400XP, then Hawker Beechcraft Hawker 400XP. One prototype converted from Model 400 and 593 built as of the end of 2009. ICAO designator BE40.

Model 400T
Military version of the Model 400A, 180 built for the United States Air Force as the T-1 Jayhawk and 13 built for the Japan Air Self-Defense Force. In Japanese service they are referred to as T-400. ICAO designator BE40.

Hawker 400XPR
A factory engineered and supported upgrade of Hawker 400XP, first flown May 2012, and certified in 2016. The conversion features new avionics, interior, winglets, and Williams FJ44-4A-32 engines. The upgrade can be performed in 12 weeks with a choice of Rockwell Collins Pro Line 4 to 21 or Garmin G5000 avionics. Hawker 400XPR increases ferry range to 2160nmi, provides better hot and high performance, and 16-20% decrease in specific fuel consumption.  400XPR has ICAO designator BE4W, which is shared with Nextant 400XT, a competing upgrade of Hawker 400 made by Nextant Aerospace.

Specifications (Hawker 400XPR)

See also

References

External links

 Hawker 400XP on the Hawker website

1980s United States business aircraft
Hawker 0400
Twinjets
Low-wing aircraft
Mitsubishi aircraft
T-tail aircraft
Aircraft first flown in 1978